Hitesh Sharma, known professionally as Tesher, is a Canadian-Indian rapper, singer-songwritter and producer . He is best known for his singles "Young Shahrukh" and "Jalebi Baby", both released in 2020. A remix version of "Jalebi Baby" was released in 2021 with Jason Derulo.

Life and career

Upbringing
Raised in Regina, Saskatchewan, Tesher was influenced by his Indian heritage as well as his Canadian upbringing. Growing up listening to Indian as well as Western hip hop music, Tesher began to fuse Bollywood and hip-hop songs together and create mashups from a young age. Later, he also began to incorporate bhangra, R&B, pop, reggaeton, house, and salsa music into his songs.

Early mashups and remixes 
Tesher began uploading his remixes to YouTube and SoundCloud when he was in high school. Around the years 2012 to 2014, he was known in particular for making country remixes.

In 2016, Tesher produced the official Bhangra mix of "Kar Gayi Chull" from the soundtrack of Bollywood film Kapoor and Sons for Sony Music India. The remix, featuring a snippet of vocals from Tesher's sister, was performed by actress Alia Bhatt at Femina Miss India 2017.

Some early mashups he created were Drake's "Back to Back" with Florence and the Machine's "Delilah" (2015), Drake's "KMT" with XXXTentacion's "Look At Me" (2017), and Ariana Grande's "7 Rings" with songs including "My Favorite Things" from The Sound of Music, Notorious B.I.G.'s "Gimme the Loot" and Soulja Boy's "Pretty Boy Swag" (2010).

In 2020, his 2019 remix "Old Town Road vs Ramta Jogi" combining Sukhwinder Singh’s "Ramta Jogi" and Lil Nas X’s "Old Town Road" went viral on TikTok as a sound accompanying a milk drinking challenge.

2020–present: Debut original singles 
In February 2020, Tesher released "Young Shahrukh", an original rap song he wrote, produced, and performed, with a beat that sampled "Bole Chudiyan" from the soundtrack of the Bollywood film Kabhi Khushi Kabhie Gham... According to Tesher, the song's title references Shahrukh Khan, who acted in Kabhi Khushi Kabhie Gham... and is commonly dubbed the "King of Bollywood". After the song went viral on social media platforms such as YouTube, Instagram and TikTok, it was picked up by Sony Music India in May 2020, becoming Tesher's debut major label single. "Young Shahrukh" peaked at number one on the BBC Asian Music Chart on the week of July 10, 2020, and at number four on Billboard'''s Top Triller Global chart on the week of July 25, 2020. Indian celebrities such as Ranveer Singh and Sunny Singh praised the song for its fusion of Bollywood with hip-hop. The official release has received over 20 million views on YouTube and 20 million streams on Spotify.

In 2020, Tesher released "Yummy Jalebi", a remix of Justin Bieber's "Yummy", with new vocals and production from Tesher. The song went viral on social media platforms including TikTok and Instagram. In response to popular demand, he released a version that removed "Yummy" and extended his verse to a full original song with his own English and Punjabi vocals. The new song, entitled "Jalebi Baby", was released as his second single on November 13, 2020. The single amassed over 100 million streams and peaked at number one on the UK Asian Music Chart for seven consecutive weeks. It also topped the Shazam charts in over 25 countries.

In 2021, Tesher signed a worldwide deal with Capitol Records in partnership with Universal Music India, which saw his music released through a unique partnership between Capitol in the U.S. and Universal Music India, who will focus on building his popularity across South Asia and its diaspora. On May 28, Tesher released a remix of "Jalebi Baby" with American singer Jason Derulo. Following the release of the remix, the track reached number 3 on Billboard's World Digital Song Sales chart, and reached the US Top 40 pop radio chart. Tesher and Derulo performed the song live on Today'' on NBC on July 7, 2021, and released the music video on July 13, 2021. On May 15, 2022, Tesher performed "Jalebi Baby" live with Simu Liu at the Juno Awards of 2022, at which he also received a nomination for Breakthrough Artist of the Year.

Discography

Singles

Videography

Music videos

Awards and nominations
{| class="wikitable plainrowheaders"
|-
! Award
! Year
! Category
! Nominee(s)/works(s)
! Result
! Ref.
|-
! scope="row" | Juno Awards
| 2022
| Breakthrough Artist of the Year
| Tesher
| 
| style="text-align:center" | 
|-

References 

Living people
1999 births
Canadian people of Indian descent
Canadian people of Punjabi descent
Canadian Hindus
Punjabi people
Punjabi Hindus
Punjabi-language singers
Canadian male rappers
Musicians of Indian descent
Canadian musicians of Indian descent
Canadian musicians of Asian descent
Musicians from Regina, Saskatchewan
Canadian male singer-songwriters
Canadian record producers
21st-century Canadian male singers
University of Regina alumni
University of Western Ontario alumni